Balarama Dasa (alternatively spelled Balaram Das;) was an Odia poet and litterateur. He was one of the 5 great poets in Odia literature, the Panchasakha during the Bhakti age of literature. He was the eldest of the Pancha sakha. He wrote the Jagamohana Ramayana also known as Dandi Ramayana.

Personal life 
Not much is known about his early life. From his own writings it is known that he was the son of Somanatha Mahapatra and Jamuna Debi. Somanatha was a minister of Gajapati Prataparudra Deva's court and originally belonged to the village of Erabanga in Puri district. He was educated and was well versed in Sanskrit. Balarama naturally grew to be proficient in both Odia and Sanskrit. He became a devotee of Jagannatha. In his Middle Ages he came in contact with Sri Chaitanya. It is speculated that he died while on a pilgrimage to Puri in Begunia village near Konark. There is a memorial for him near this village.

Literary works 

Dasa translated the Ramayana to Odia. It is also known as Jagamohana Ramayana or Dandi Ramayana. More than a translation, the work is a transcreation, as it deviates in many ways from the original. In some parts he goes against the original text and in some parts follows the original text closely and yet in some other parts he creates entirely new narratives.

He also broke new grounds by translating the Bhagabat Gita into Odia. Before this the philosophical and theological texts were not translated into Odia. Even in Odia Mahabharata by Sarala Dasa, the portion containing Bhagabata Gita was omitted by the author. Balarama Dasa was subsequently persecuted by the priestly class for his translation of Bhagabata Gita.
His other works are as below.

References 

Indian male poets
Odia-language poets
Poets from Odisha
Odia people
Year of birth uncertain
16th-century Indian poets
Devotees of Jagannath
Odissi music composers
Shudra Hindu saints
Odia Hindu saints
15th-century Indian poets
1472 births
1556 deaths
Vaishnava saints
15th-century Hindu religious leaders